Lisa Pigato (born 21 June 2003) is an Italian tennis player. She has a career-high singles ranking of 369 by the Women's Tennis Association (WTA), reached on 19 September 2022. She also has a highest doubles ranking of world No. 187, achieved on 18 July 2022. Pigato has won three women's singles titles and four in doubles on the ITF Women's Circuit.

Junior career
Junior Grand Slam results - Singles:

 Australian Open: 3R (2019)
 French Open: 1R (2021)
 Wimbledon: Q1 (2019)
 US Open: Q1 (2018)

Junior Grand Slam results - Doubles:

 Australian Open: 1R (2019, 2020)
 French Open: W (2020)
 Wimbledon: –
 US Open: –

Pigato won the 2020 French Open girls' doubles event, partnering Eleonora Alvisi. They defeated the Russian pairing of Maria Bondarenko and Diana Shnaider in the final.

Professional career

2021
She made her WTA Tour main-draw debut at the 2021 Emilia-Romagna Open, where she won two qualifying matches before losing to Serena Williams in the first round.

ITF Circuit finals

Singles: 3 (3 titles)

Doubles: 10 (4 titles, 6 runner–ups)

Junior Grand Slam tournament finals

Girls' doubles

References

External links
 
 

2003 births
Living people
Italian female tennis players
Grand Slam (tennis) champions in girls' doubles
French Open junior champions
21st-century Italian women